Studený is a municipality and village in Benešov District in the Central Bohemian Region of the Czech Republic. It has about 90 inhabitants.

Administrative parts
The village of Petrova Lhota is an administrative part of Studený.

References

Villages in Benešov District